Soohorang is the official mascot of the 2018 Winter Olympics, and Bandabi is the official mascot of the 2018 Winter Paralympics. Both events were held in Pyeongchang, Gangwon, South Korea. Soohorang is a white tiger and Bandabi is an Asiatic black bear. The mascots were selected through a national tender process held in 2014 and were approved of by the International Olympic Committee (IOC) on June 2, 2016.

Selection
On June 27, 2014, the Pyeongchang Organizing Committee notified the public of their mascot selection contest. The selection process took place from September 15, 2014 to September 30, 2014. On June 2, 2016, the International Olympic Committee approved the mascots for the games.

Characteristics

Soohorang 
Soohorang is the mascot of the 2018 Winter Olympics. "Sooho" means "protection" in Korean, symbolizing the protection offered to the athletes, participants and spectators at the Winter Olympics, as well as preserving the world peace that is the spirit of the Olympic Games. "Rang" derives from "Ho-rang-i", the Korean word for "tiger"; it is also the last letter of "Jeongseon Arirang", a cherished traditional Korean folk song of Gangwon Province.

Soohorang took its motif from the white tiger, known as "baekho" in Korean, which is considered to be Korea's sacred guardian animal. Its colour is also indicative of the snow and ice of winter sports.

Tigers have long been a notable aspect of Korean folklore and culture. Baekho, the white tiger, is described in myths and narratives as a divine imaginary animal that watches over the mountains and nature. A cultural symbol for prosperity and protection, Baekho is revered as a god who cares for humanity, praying for the peace and well-being of the village in Korean folklore, while maintaining the continuity of Hodori which was the mascot of the 1988 Summer Olympics in Seoul. It has also been noted that Baekho is in harmony with the Winter Games that take place in "the white fields of snow".

In summary, Soohorang is full of "passion and enthusiasm" and "a strong personality that protects the people who participate in the Olympics."

Bandabi 
Bandabi is the mascot of the 2018 Winter Paralympics. It is a symbol of will and courage. "Banda" means "half-moon" or a "half-moon beast", and "bi" means to celebrate the competition.

Bandabi is a warm-hearted friend who "has strong will and courage, is at the forefront of equality and harmony," and supports the enthusiasm of the players in the Paralympics so that they can overcome their limitations.

Bandabi also has a continuity with Gomdoori, which was a mascot at the 1988 Summer Paralympics in Seoul.

Media

Emoticons
Soohorang and Bandabi are available as animated emoticons in KakaoTalk, a popular messaging, texting, or communication application in South Korea.

Reception
The public reception to the mascots has been described as overwhelmingly positive. According to Hannah Keyser, a writer for sports news website Deadspin, the mascots could be found "everywhere" during the Olympics, and they were "surprisingly universally beloved". Dan McQuade, another writer for Deadspin, commented that it will be difficult for Miraitowa and Someity to match the popularity of Soohorang and Bandabi.

Gallery

See also

Hodori – the mascot of the 1988 Summer Olympics in Seoul, South Korea
 Tigers in Korean culture

References

External links

Pyeongchang, 2018
Pyeongchang, 2018
Bear mascots
Tiger mascots
Fictional tigers
Fictional bears
Fictional characters with superhuman strength
Fictional South Korean people
South Korean mascots
Olympic mascots
Paralympic mascots
Feline mascots
Mascots introduced in 2016
Male characters in advertising